St. Mary's High School is a co-educational, Roman Catholic high school located in Lancaster, New York, 4.5 miles South East of the Buffalo Niagara International Airport and 14.5 East of downtown Buffalo. The school is within the Diocese of Buffalo. St. Mary's enrollment includes students in grades 9-12 from four counties and approximately 30 school districts.  The current "Head of School" is Kevin Kelleher.

Notable alumni

Dale Volker- Retired New York State Senator, 59th Senate District
Frank Lazarus-Provost and Vice President for Academic Affairs at Assumption College in Worcester, Massachusetts
Adam Page- USA Sledge Hockey Player and 2-time Paralympic Gold Medalist

Notes and references

External links
The official website of St. Mary's High School

Catholic secondary schools in New York (state)
Educational institutions established in 1904
Schools in Erie County, New York
1904 establishments in New York (state)